"I Don't Believe in Love" is a song by progressive metal band Queensrÿche, taken from their 1988 album Operation: Mindcrime. It was released as the last single for the album in 1989, and has also been featured in all four of their compilations, Evolution Calling, Greatest Hits, Classic Masters, and Sign of the Times: The Best of Queensrÿche, making it one of the band's most well-known songs.
 
In 1990, "I Don't Believe in Love" was nominated for the Grammy for Best Metal Performance, losing to "One" by Metallica. A fan favorite track, the band has played it numerous instances live, a full 895 times as of March 2017 (making it the sixth most played tune in the groups' setlist history).

Track listing

Chart performance

Personnel
 Geoff Tate – vocals
 Michael Wilton – guitars
 Chris DeGarmo – guitars
 Eddie Jackson – bass
 Scott Rockenfield – drums

References

1988 songs
1989 singles
EMI Records singles
Queensrÿche songs
Song recordings produced by Peter Collins (record producer)
Songs written by Chris DeGarmo
Songs written by Geoff Tate